Dudaran or Do Daran may refer to:
 Dudaran, Ardabil
 Do Daran, Hormozgan
 Do Daran, Kerman